This is a list of public art in the English county of Berkshire. This list applies only to works of art accessible in an outdoor public space. For example, this does not include artwork  visible inside a museum.

Bradfield

Maidenhead

Newbury

Pangbourne

Reading

Windsor

References

External links 
Public Works of Art in Reading from the Trooper Potts VC Memorial Site via the Internet Archive

Berkshire
English art
Culture in Berkshire